Enas delikanis is a 1963 Greek film directed by Manolis Skouloudis.  It stars Ilya Livykou and Dionysis Papagiannopoulos.  It was filmed on the island of Crete.

Plot
The son of Pontikaki, Manouelis, had grown up and became more beautiful.  All the ladies from the village knew that were much from all the singing women, Paraskevoula.  Manouelis fell in love with Smaragditsa.  His father tried to bring himself a shame, brought his aunt Eirinaki which she lives in the mountains along with their friends.  As her aunt seduced from her beauty and that she wanted to love.  Manouelis left from the mountains and headed for Ladochori at the time they had a funeral.  The president of the village wrote from his voice that received and knew the spot that the singer and headed to the house in which live their six ladies.

Cast

Alkis Giannakas as Manouilis Pontikis
Manos Katrakis as Pan
Ilya Livykou as Eirinaki or Irinaki
Kleo Skouloudi as the singer's wife
Dionyssis Papayannopoulos as the mayor
Kostas Kazakos as Leonidas
Anna Paitazi
Aliki Zografou as Panago Pontiki
Efi Ikonomou as Rosie

Awards
 5 awards at the 1963 Thessaloniki Film Festival (photography (Dimos Sakellariou), first ladies role (Ilya Livykou), critic photography (Dimos Sakellariou), first ladies critic role (Ilya Livykou, and Alkis Giannakas)
 First Ladies role (Ilya Livykou) at the 1963 San Francisco Film Festival

Other information

 Tickets: 295,493
 It was the first film appearance by Alkis Giannakas.

See also
 List of Greek films

External links
 
 Enas delikanis at cine.gr 

1963 films
1963 comedy films
1960s Greek-language films
Greek comedy films